Tore Bruvoll (born 30 October 1978 in Tromsø) is a Norwegian musician (guitar and multi-instrumentalist), composer and music arranger.

Career 
Bruvoll was educated at Telemark University College (1997–1999), and is best known from the group Hekla Stålstrenga who have released two albums. He has also had great success with two otherprojects: "Den Store Norske Gitarkvartett" and the duo cooperation Bruvoll/Halvorsen together with the kveder Jon Anders Halvorsen. Bruvoll has collaborated with many other artists in traditional folk like Annbjørg Lien and String Sisters. Bruvoll has since the late 1990s worked closely with Ragnhild Furebotten, which has resulted in the founding of the band Hekla Stålstrenga, including two nominations for the Spellemannprisen and extensive touring in Norway as well as internationally.

Bruvoll also plays other instruments like banjo, dobro, mandolin, ukulele and low whistle as well as guitar.

Honors 
 2006: Young Arts Scholarship by the Festival of Northern Norway within Hekla Stålstrenga

Discography 
Majorstuens – "Juledrøm" (2006)
String Sisters "Live in Norway" cd&dvd (Grappa 2007)
ALB – Lupus Island (2006)
Steve Byrne – "Songs from home" (2006)

With Jogvan Andrias – "Soleidis saman" (2000)

With Jon Anders Halvorsen
2004: Nattasang (Heilo)
2007: Trillar For To (Heilo)

With String Sisters
2007: Live (Heilo)

With Ragnhild Furebotten
2008: Hekla Stålstrenga (Ta:lik), nominated for the Spellemannprisen 2008

Within Hekla Stålstrenga
2011: Makramé (Ta:lik), nominated for the Spellemannprisen] 2011
2013: Dyrandé (Ta:lik)

With Sondre Bratland
2011: Jol I Mi Song (Kirkelig Kulturverksted)

References

External links 
Tore Bruvoll at Hekla Stålstrenga Website

1978 births
Living people
Musicians from Tromsø
Norwegian folk guitarists
Norwegian male guitarists
Norwegian composers
Norwegian male composers
Heilo Music artists
21st-century Norwegian guitarists
21st-century Norwegian male musicians